The ice dance competition of the 2018 Winter Olympics was held on 19 and 20 February 2018 at the Gangneung Ice Arena in Gangneung, South Korea. The short dance was held on 19 February and the free dance was held on 20 February.

Summary 
Tessa Virtue and Scott Moir scored 83.67 in the short dance, breaking their own world record. Gabriella Papadakis and Guillaume Cizeron finished in second place, 1.74 points behind Virtue/Moir. Maia Shibutani and Alex Shibutani finished in fourth place, and Madison Hubbell and Zachary Donohue were third, with just 0.02 points separating the two couples.

Shibutani/Shibutani were the 17th couple to take to the ice in the free dance, starting off in 4th place after the short dance; they took the lead with a combined total score of 192.59. Papadakis/Cizeron were next to skate, and they broke their world records for both the free dance and the total score, finishing with 205.28 points. Hubbell/Donohue received a deduction for a fall and were briefly in third place with 187.69 points. The last to skate were Virtue/Moir, who scored less than Papadakis/Cizeron in the free dance but still scored enough points overall to win the gold medal, setting another world record with a total score of 206.07.

This was the third Olympic medal that Virtue/Moir had won in ice dance; they won their first gold in 2010 and they took silver in 2014. It was also their fifth Olympic medal overall (including two team medals in 2014 and 2018), making them the most decorated figure skaters in Olympic history.

For the first time since ice dance became an Olympic event in 1976, no Soviet or Russian team won a medal.

Records 

For complete list of figure skating records, see list of highest scores in figure skating.

The following new best scores were set during this competition:

Qualification 

A total of 24 teams qualified to compete for the event, with each country allowed to enter a maximum of three teams. 19 quotas were handed out during the 2017 World Figure Skating Championships, however Denmark was forced to return the quota when it was found that one of their athletes did not have Danish citizenship (and there was no other eligible team from the country). The remaining six quotas were given out at the 2017 CS Nebelhorn Trophy. Each country decided the entry of its teams, and athletes winning the quota were not necessarily granted the right to compete. All pairs competing needed to have met the minimum total elements score, which did not include component scores. For the short program this was 19.00 and for the free skate it was 29.00.

Schedule 
All times are (UTC+9).

Results

Short dance 
The short dance was held on 19 February.

Free dance 
The free dance was held on 20 February.

Overall 
The skaters were ranked according to their total combined (overall) score.

SD - Short dance; FD - Free dance

References

Citations 

Ice dance
2018
Mixed events at the 2018 Winter Olympics
2018 in figure skating